"Language speaks" (in the original German Die Sprache spricht) is a saying by Martin Heidegger. Heidegger first formulated it in his 1950 lecture "Language" (Die Sprache), and frequently repeated it in later works.

Adorno expressed a related idea when he said that language "acquires a voice" and "speaks itself."

The "Language" lecture
The saying was first formulated by Heidegger in the lecture "Language" ("Die Sprache") in memory of Max Kommerell, first delivered on October 7, 1950 at the Bühlerhöhe building. The lecture was translated in English by Albert Hofstadter in the 1971 Heidegger collection Poetry, Language, Thought.

Quoting Johann Georg Hamann's 1784 letter to Johann Gottfried Herder, Heidegger talks of language as an "abyss."

See also
Wilhelm von Humboldt

Notes

References
Heidegger (1950) "Die Sprache", first published in Heidegger (1959) Unterwegs zur Sprache
Heidegger (1971) Poetry, Language, Thought, translation and introduction by Albert Hofstadter
Lyon, James K. Paul Celan and Martin Heidegger: an unresolved conversation, 1951-1970
Philipse, Herman (1998) Heidegger's philosophy of being: a critical interpretation

Martin Heidegger
Philosophical phrases
German words and phrases
1950s neologisms
Quotations from literature
Quotations from philosophy